Charles Allen Austin (born December 19, 1967) is an American athlete who won the gold medal in the men's high jump at the 1996 Summer Olympics in Atlanta. He was inducted into the United States Track & Field Hall of Fame in 2012.  Currently, Charles and Javier Sotomayor are the only two high jumpers that have won gold medals in the Olympics, Outdoor World Championships, Indoor World Championships and World Cup Championships.  Hennadiy Avdyeyenko, who won the inaugural 1983 Outdoor World Championship setting the championship high jump record with a jump of 2.32m (7' 7 1/4"), and Charles are the only two high jumpers to win and establish the championship record in both the Outdoor World Championship and Olympic Games. Also, Charles has the highest combined average height for the two championships.

Career
Charles Austin coached himself over his 15-year professional career to where only seven people in the history of the high jump jumped higher.  Standing 6' 1/2", he jumped 22 inches over his height, sixth all time. An Olympic gold medalist, Austin is the current American and Olympic high jump record holder, two-time World Champion, and a nine-time national track and field high jump champion. From starting in high school to the end of his career, Charles improved almost a foot in height.

Born in Bay City, Texas, and raised in Van Vleck, Texas, Austin was the youngest of 10 children. He was a senior in high school without any way to pay for college, when some friends convinced him to try high jumping for the track team. He cleared six feet on his first try to make the team and finished the year with a personal best of 6' 11".

Austin's success landed him an athletic scholarship at Southwest Texas University (now Texas State University). After a difficult first few years, he climbed the ranks in the NCAA, shattering school records and his senior year, won the NCAA Outdoor Championship in 1990 and was the number one college high jumper in the country.
 
In 1991, Austin graduated with a degree in business administration. Within the year, five years after taking up the high jump in 1986, he was the American Record Holder (2.40m – 7'10 1/2"), gold medalist at the 1991 World Championship and was a contender to win in the Olympics. However, when he arrived at the 1992 Olympic trials there was speculation on whether or not he should compete, due to a knee injury. He pushed forward, making it on to the U.S. team, but his confidence was shaken and a poor performance cost him a medal. He finished in eighth place.

The trouble continued, forcing Austin to have major surgery in July 1993 where almost half of his patellar tendon had to be removed due to the damage that was caused.  Because of the severity of the injury Austin was told his high jump career was over.  He took it upon himself to rehabilitate his knee back to where he could once again compete at the highest level.  He was left to watch from home as his fellow athletes competed in the 1993 World Championship. But while his knee healed, Austin's passion continued to grow. In 1994, he began his journey back to the top of the world high jump ranks. Within a few years, he had regained his strength and was once again performing at a high level.

When he returned to the Olympics in 1996, he did so with a new determination and mental focus. His gold winning jump of 7' 10" was a new Olympic record and still stands today.  He was inducted into the United States Hall of Fame in 2012

After Athletics

Austin is the owner of So High Sports and Fitness (SoHighSports.com) a sports performance and personal training company.  He opened his So High Sports and Fitness Studio in 2002 and his So High Sports and Fitness Performance Center in 2008. Both are located in San Marcos, Texas.  Charles is also the author of the book, Head Games:  Life's Greatest Challenge.

In 2014, Charles introduced his patented Total Body Board (TotalBodyBoard.com) to the fitness equipment market.  The Total Body Board is a versatile piece of fitness equipment.

Also, Charles set the Master's 45–50 age group World Record with a jump of 6' 8 3/4" (2.05m).

Achievements

 3-Time Olympian (1992, 1996, 2000)
 1998 World Cup Champion
 1997 Indoor World Championship High Jump Gold Medalist
 1996 Olympic High Jump Gold Medalist
 1991 Outdoor World Championship High Jump Gold Medalist
 1990 NCAA Outdoor High Jump Champion
 6-Time U. S. Outdoor Track & Field High Jump Champion (Consecutive)
 3-Time U. S. Indoor Track & Field High Jump Champion
 Current American High Jump Record Holder 7' 10 1/2" (Set in 1991)
 Current Olympic High Jump Record Holder 7' 10" (Set in 1996)
 Competitions Over 2.30m (7' 6 1/2") – 61
 1st Place (41), Second Place (13), Third Place (4), Fourth Place (1), Fifth Place (2)
 2001 Outdoor World Track & Field Championship Team Captain
 2001 Indoor World Track & Field Championship Team Captain
 2000 Olympic Track & Field Men's Team Captain
 1999 Outdoor World Track & Field Championship Team Captain
 1999 Indoor World Track & Field Championship Team Captain
 1998 World Cup Team Captain
 1997 Outdoor World Track & Field Championship Team Captain
 1997 Indoor World Track & Field Championship Flag Barrier
 Selected by the United States Olympic Committee to present President Clinton with the Presidential Olympic plaque at the White House (1996)
 Inducted into the United States Track & Field Hall of Fame, Class of 2012
 Inducted into the Texas Track and Field Coaches Association Hall of Fame, Class of 2017

References

External links 
 

1967 births
Living people
American male high jumpers
African-American male track and field athletes
Athletes (track and field) at the 1992 Summer Olympics
Athletes (track and field) at the 1996 Summer Olympics
Athletes (track and field) at the 2000 Summer Olympics
Olympic gold medalists for the United States in track and field
People from Bay City, Texas
Track and field athletes from Texas
World Athletics Championships medalists
Medalists at the 1996 Summer Olympics
Goodwill Games medalists in athletics
World Athletics Indoor Championships winners
World Athletics Championships winners
Competitors at the 1998 Goodwill Games
21st-century African-American people
20th-century African-American sportspeople